The African mammoth, Mammuthus africanavus (literally, "African ancestor mammoth"), is the second oldest mammoth species, having first appeared around 3 million years ago during the late Pliocene, with a last appearance around 1.65 million years ago in the early Pleistocene. Its fossils have been found in Chad, Libya, Morocco and Tunisia. It was relatively small and is seen as the direct ancestor of M. meriodionalis, although its tusk diverged more widely from its skull than later species of mammoth, which might indicate that it was an evolutionary dead end.

References

Mammoths
Pliocene proboscideans
Pliocene mammals of Africa